Epoca (Italian: Age) was an Italian illustrated weekly current events magazine published between 1950 and 1997 in Milan, Italy.

History and profile

Epoca was first published on 14 October 1950. The magazine was modeled on Life and Paris Match. Epoca was the first Italian publication which employed the illustrations like these and other popular magazines of the period such as Look.

The magazine was part of Mondadori and was based in Milan. Its first editor was Alberto Mondadori who was succeeded in the post by Enzo Biagi in 1953. During the period until 1960 when Enzo Biagi edited Epoca the magazine covered current affairs news, social attitudes as well as TV news. The magazine also included frequent and detailed articles about Hollywood stars of the period and Italian movie stars such as Gina Lollobrigida. The weekly had offices in New York City, Paris and Tokyo. From June 1952 to the late 1958 the Cuban-Italian writer Alba de Céspedes wrote an agony column, called Dalla parte di lei, in the magazine.

Then Epoca became part of Rizzoli Editori and began to cover travel and nature news with photographs and scientific articles. The magazine had a section called I bei posti (Italian: Beautiful Places) which featured the photographs of unknown places such as Bahamas, Marrakesh and Acapulco by Mario de Biasi, Alfredo Panucci and Giorgio Lotti.

Epoca was closed down in 1997 due to low circulation.

Political stance
Epoca  was established as a pro-American and conservative magazine. In the period between 1952 and 1953 the magazine supported the Italian government. During the 1960s the magazine had a moderate political stance, but was extremely anti-communist. It was extremely conservative in the late 1960s and considered miniskirts as immoral dresses.

Circulation
Epoca had a circulation of 150,000 copies in the period 1952–1953. The magazine sold 420,000 copies in 1955. Its circulation was 400,000 copies in 1963 and 305,000 copies in 1964. In 1970 the circulation of Epoca was 350,000 copies. The weekly had a circulation of 120,046 copies in 1984.

See also
 List of magazines in Italy

References

External links

1950 establishments in Italy
1997 disestablishments in Italy
Arnoldo Mondadori Editore
Conservatism in Italy
Conservative magazines
Defunct political magazines published in Italy
Italian-language magazines
Magazines established in 1950
Magazines disestablished in 1997
Magazines published in Milan
News magazines published in Italy
Photojournalistic magazines
Weekly magazines published in Italy